Leptobrachella juliandringi is a species of frogs in the family Megophryidae. It is a newly discovered species of the genus Leptobrachella, endemic to Borneo.

References

juliandringi
Amphibians described in 2015